Fred Wilson (17 July 1912 – 5 January 1953) was  a former Australian rules footballer who played with Richmond in the Victorian Football League (VFL).

Notes

External links 
		

1912 births
1953 deaths
Australian rules footballers from Victoria (Australia)
Richmond Football Club players